The Embrace Your Light Tour was the thirty-fourth concert tour of North America by Santana in 2005.

Tour band 
 Andy Vargas – lead vocals
 Carlos Santana – lead guitar, percussion, vocals
 Tommy Anthony – rhythm guitar
 Chester D. Thompson – keyboards, vocals
 Salvador Santana – keyboards
 Benny Rietveld – bass guitar
 Dennis Chambers – drums
 William Ortiz – trumpet
 Jeff Cresman – trombone
 Bobby Allende – percussion, vocals
 Karl Perazzo – timbales, percussion, vocals
 Raul Rekow – congas, bongos, percussion, vocals (since August 31)

Set list 
An average set list of this tour was as follows:

 "Jin-go-lo-ba" (Babatunde Olatunji)
 "Hermes" (Carlos Santana, S. Jurad)
 "Concierto de Aranjuez" (Joaquín Rodrigo)
 "I Am Somebody" (William Adams, Jr., George Pajon)
 "El Fuego" (Santana, Jean Shepherd, Richard Shepherd)
 "Maria Maria" (Santana, Karl Perazzo, Raul Rekow, Wyclef Jean, Jerry Duplessis)
 "Foo Foo" (Yvon André, Roger Eugène, Yves Joseph, Hermann Nau, Claude Jean)
 "Intimo"
 "Brown Skin Girl" (Jamie Houston)
 "Sun Ra"
 "Hey Boogie Woman" (Bill Bartlett)
 "Spiritual" (John Coltrane)
 "(Da Le) Yaleo" (Santana, Shakara Mutela, Christian Polloni)
 "I Don't Wanna Lose Your Love" (Henry Garza, Ringo Garza, Joey Garza)
 "Apache" (Jerry Lordan)
 "Smooth" (Itaal Shur, Rob Thomas)
 "Dame Tu Amor" (Abraham Quintanilla, Ricky Vela, Richard Brooks)
 "Corazón Espinado" (Fher Olvera)
 "Evil Ways" (Clarence "Sonny" Henry)
Encore
 "Black Magic Woman" (Peter Green)
 "Gypsy Queen" (Gábor Szabó)
 "Oye Como Va" (Tito Puente)
 "A Love Supreme" (John Coltrane)

Tour dates

Leg 1 (May 3 – July 3, 2005)

Leg 2 (September 15 – October 16, 2005)

Box office score data

Notes

References

External links 
 Santana Past Shows 2005 at Santana official website

Santana (band) concert tours
2005 concert tours
Concert tours of North America